Undercurrent is a 1946 American film noir drama directed by Vincente Minnelli and starring Katharine Hepburn, Robert Taylor, and Robert Mitchum. The screenplay was written by Edward Chodorov, based on the story "You Were There'" by Thelma Strabel, and allegedly contained uncredited contributions from Marguerite Roberts.

Plot

Ann Hamilton loves her husband Alan Garroway but their marriage is haunted by the absent figure of his brother Michael. A dark secret seems to lurk around the brothers' relationship and Ann's curiosity will eventually lead to its unveiling.

Cast
 Katharine Hepburn	as Ann Hamilton
 Robert Taylor as Alan Garroway
 Robert Mitchum as Michael Garroway
 Edmund Gwenn as Prof. "Dink" Hamilton
 Marjorie Main as Lucy
 Jayne Meadows as Sylvia Lea Burton
 Clinton Sundberg as Mr. Warmsley
 Dan Tobin as Prof. Joseph Bangs
 Kathryn Card as Mrs. Foster
 Leigh Whipper as George
 Charles Trowbridge as Justice Putnam
 James Westerfield as Henry Gilson
 Billy McClain as Uncle Ben
 Milton Kibbee as Minister
 Jean Andren as Mrs. Davenport
 Forbes Murray as Senator Edwards
 Gordon Richards as Headwaiter
Cast notes:
Undercurrent marked Robert Taylor's screen return after spending three years in the Navy.
Jayne Meadows made her film debut in this film.
 "Rommy", the dog, was trained by Hollywood's most prestigious dog trainers, the Rudd Weatherwax family.

Production
Undercurrent was only director Vincente Minnelli's second dramatic film, the first being The Clock, which starred his wife at the time, Judy Garland. Minnelli's specialty was in directing the kind of glossy musicals that M-G-M's Arthur Freed unit turned out.  Because he trusted producer Pandro S. Berman's judgement in regard to the film's star, Katharine Hepburn – who had already signed on to do the film – Minnelli accepted the assignment; Berman had produced Alice Adams and Stage Door with Hepburn when they both worked for RKO Pictures. Berman and Minnelli would go on to make Madame Bovary (1949), Father of the Bride (1950), and other successful films together.

Metro-Goldwyn-Mayer paid David O. Selznick $25,000 and RKO $75,000 for the use of Robert Mitchum. Mitchum was working on two other films at the same time, Desire Me (1947) and The Locket (1946), which prompted director Vincente Minnelli to wonder if that was how Mitchum maintained his sleepy-eyed look.

Hepburn was opinionated about her colleagues.  She wasn't impressed by Mitchum, an opinion she did not hide, and, at least at first, was not happy about Minnelli being the director of the film. Hepburn's self-assurance made Minnelli nervous, but the two grew to be good friends, a fact which annoyed Robert Taylor, who was afraid that the film would become a showcase for Hepburn.  He changed his mind, though, after realizing that Minnelli's direction was helping to improve his performance.

The musical motif featured in the film is an excerpt from Johannes Brahms' Symphony No. 3.

Reception

Critical response
Variety magazine lauded the film and wrote, "Undercurrent is heavy drama with femme appeal...Hepburn sells her role with usual finesse and talent. Robert Mitchum, as the missing brother, has only three scenes, but makes them count for importance."

Critic Bosley Crowther of The New York Times also liked the film and wrote, "However, that is Undercurrent-—and you must take it upon its own terms, which are those of theatrical dogmatism, if you hope to endure it at all. If you do, you may find it gratifying principally because Miss Hepburn gives a crisp and taut performance of a lady overcome by mounting fears and Mr. Taylor, back in films from his war service, accelerates a brooding meanness as her spouse. You may also find Robert Mitchum fairly appealing in a crumpled, modest way as the culturally oriented brother, even though he appears in only a couple of scenes. And you may like Edmund Gwenn and Jayne Meadows, among others, in minor roles."

More recently, critic Dennis Schwartz wrote, "Director Vincente Minnelli...known mostly through his upbeat MGM musicals, changes direction with this tearjerker femme appealing romantic melodrama, that can also be viewed as a heavy going psychological film noir (at least, stylishly noir through the brilliantly dark photography of Karl Freund)...Though overlong and filled with too many misleading clues about which brother is the baddie, the acting is superb, even though both Katharine Hepburn and Robert Mitchum are cast against type (a weak woman and a sensitive man). It successfully takes on the theme from Gaslight."

Box office
The film was popular at the box office; according to MGM records, it earned $2,828,000 in the US and Canada and $1,409,000 elsewhere, resulting in a profit of $1,001,000. Variety said it grossed $3.25 million in 1946.

Adaptations
Lux Radio Theatre aired a one-hour radio adaptation of the film on October 6, 1947, with Katharine Hepburn and Robert Taylor reprising their roles. It aired a second adaptation on November 30, 1953, this time with Joan Fontaine and Mel Ferrer in the lead roles.

See also
Gothic romance film

References

External links
 
 
 
 
 
 Undercurrent at DVD Beaver (includes images)
 Undercurrent film clip at Turner Classic Movies Media Room
 

1946 films
1946 drama films
American drama films
American black-and-white films
Film noir
Films based on American novels
Films directed by Vincente Minnelli
Films scored by Herbert Stothart
Metro-Goldwyn-Mayer films
1940s English-language films
1940s American films